Dale Purves (born March 11, 1938) is Geller Professor of Neurobiology Emeritus in the Duke Institute for Brain Sciences where he remains Research Professor with additional appointments in the department of Psychology and Brain Sciences, and the department of Philosophy at Duke University. He earned a B.A. from Yale University in 1960 and an M.D. from Harvard Medical School in 1964. After further clinical training as a surgical resident at the Massachusetts General Hospital, service as a Peace Corps physician, and postdoctoral training at Harvard and University College London, he was appointed to the faculty at Washington University School of Medicine in 1973. He came to Duke in 1990 as the founding chair of the Department of Neurobiology at Duke Medical Center, and was subsequently Director of Duke's Center for Cognitive Neuroscience (2003-2009) and also served as the Director of the Neuroscience and Behavioral Disorders Program at the Duke-NUS Graduate Medical School in Singapore (2009-2013).

Although Purves was elected to the National Academy of Sciences in 1989 for his work on neural development and synaptic plasticity, his research during the last 15 years has sought to explain why we see and hear what we do, focusing on the visual perception of lightness, color, form, and motion, and the auditory perception of music and speech.

In addition to membership in the National Academy of Sciences, Purves is a fellow of the American Academy of Arts and Sciences and the National Academy of Medicine. His books include Principles of Neural Development (with Jeff W. Lichtman; Sinaur, 1985); Body and Brain (Harvard, 1988); Neural Activity and the Growth of the Brain (Cambridge, 1992); Why We See What We Do (with Beau Lotto; Sinauer, 2003); Perceiving Geometry (with Catherine Howe; Springer 2005); Why We See What We Do Redux (Sinauer, 2011) and Brains: How they Seem to Work (Financial Times Press, 2011). He is also lead author on the textbooks Neuroscience, (5th edition, Sinauer, 2011), Principles of Cognitive Neuroscience (2nd edition, Sinauer, 2012), and Music as Biology (Harvard University Press, 2017).

Education 
Purves was a surgical house officer at the Massachusetts General Hospital and a Peace Corps physician. His focus then changed from clinical medicine to neurobiology. In 1960, Purves received a Bachelor of Arts degree from Yale University and in 1964, a doctoral degree from Harvard Medical School.

Purves took a postdoctoral fellowship in the Department of Neurobiology at Harvard University from 1968 to 1971 and in the Department of Biophysics, University College London, from 1971 to 1973.

Career 
Purves joined the faculty of the Department of Physiology and Biophysics at the Washington University School of Medicine in 1971 and was there until 1990. During that time he studied the development of the nervous system. He was elected to the United States National Academy of Sciences in 1989.

In 1990, Purves founded the Department of Neurobiology at Duke University where he did research on the cognitive neuroscience of visual and auditory perception.

Published works

Books 
 Purves, D. (1985) Principles of Neural Development, Sinauer Associates, Sunderland, MA. .
 Purves, D. et al. (1997) Neuroscience 1st edition. Sinauer Associates, Sunderland, MA.
 Purves, D. et al. (2001) Neuroscience 2nd edition. Sinauer Associates, Sunderland, MA.
 Purves, D. et al. (2003) Why we see what we do: An empirical theory of vision. Sinauer Associates, Sunderland, MA.
Purves, D. et al. (2004) Neuroscience 3rd edition. Sinauer Associates, Sunderland, MA.
 Purves, D. et al. (2007) Principles of Cognitive Neuroscience Sinauer Associates, Sunderland, MA.
Purves, D. et al. (2008) Neuroscience 4th edition. Sinauer Associates, Sunderland, MA.
Purves, D. (2010) Brains: How they Seem to Work. Financial Times Press, NJ.
 Purves, D. et al. (2011) Neuroscience 5th edition. Sinauer Associates, Sunderland, MA.
Purves, D. and Lotto, R. (2011) Why We See What We Do Redux: A Wholly Empirical Theory of Vision. Sinauer Associates, MA.
 Purves, D. et al. (2017) Neuroscience 6th edition. Sinauer Associates, Sunderland, MA.
Purves, D. (2017) Music as Biology: The Tones We Like and Why. Cambridge, MA: Harvard University Press.
Purves, D. (2019) Brains as engines of association: an operating principle for nervous systems. Oxford University Press.

References

News and magazine articles 
 Official Website Purveslab.net.
 Choi, C. Explaining the aperture illusion. Scientific American 29 March 2009.
 Musical chords mimic the emotion of speech. Daily News and Analysis, India, 15 December 2009.
 The Biology of music: why we like what we like. Boing Boing 14 December 2009.
 Vieru, T. Music, Emotions and Speech form a whole. Softpedia 3 December 2009.
 Duke team Explains Longtime visual puzzler in new way. Duke Medicine News and Communications 13 October 2008.
 Kruglinski, S. Musical scales mimic of language. Discover Magazine, 100 Top Science Stories of 2007. January 2008.
 Scientists explain the 'flash-lag' effect. Science News, United Press 14 October 2008.
 Thank K. In search of music's biological roots. Duke Magazine May 2008.
 Bates, K. The Essential tones of Music rooted in Human Speech Duke University 25 May 2007
 ScienceDaily Essential tones of music rooted in human speech. Science Daily 24 May 2007.
 Hareyan, A. Brain Statistics help humans perceive hue, saturation and brightness. 6 April 2006
 Meredith, D. New book explains age-old mystery of geometrical illusions. Duke News Releases 30 September 2005.
 Vision is a ‘reflex’, says new book. Duke Medicine News and Communications 3 January 2003.
 Farley, P. Musical roots may lie in human voice. Newscientist.com August 3, 2003.
 Keneally, C. Songs of ourselves. Boston Globe 9 November 2003.
 Meredith, D. Solving the mystery of musical harmony: Insights from a study of speech. Duke News Releases, 5 August 2003.
 How We See Transcript from News Hour with Jim Lehrer 25 December 2002.
 Meredith, D. Color scheme: new vision theory states perception of color depends on neural reflexes. Dialogue, Duke University 2000 5(3).
 

1938 births
Living people
American neuroscientists
Yale University alumni
Harvard Medical School alumni
Duke University faculty
Washington University in St. Louis faculty
Academics of University College London
Massachusetts General Hospital residents
Members of the United States National Academy of Sciences
American textbook writers
20th-century American physicians
21st-century American physicians
Members of the National Academy of Medicine